Gilbert Charles Raynes (21 August 1903 – 17 June 1986) was a British gymnast. He competed in seven events at the 1928 Summer Olympics.

References

1903 births
1986 deaths
British male artistic gymnasts
Olympic gymnasts of Great Britain
Gymnasts at the 1928 Summer Olympics
Sportspeople from Wolverhampton